Yeliseykovo is a rural locality (a village) in Pekshinskoye Rural Settlement, Petushinsky District, Vladimir Oblast, Russia. The population was 12 as of 2010.

Geography 
Yeliseykovo is located on the Peksha River, 24 km northeast of Petushki (the district's administrative centre) by road. Yeliseykovo is the nearest rural locality.

References 

Rural localities in Petushinsky District